The 2003 Japanese Grand Prix (formally the 2003 Fuji Television Japanese Grand Prix) was a Formula One motor race held on 12 October 2003 at the Suzuka Circuit, Suzuka, Mie, Japan. It was the sixteenth and final round of the 2003 Formula One season, as well as the 29th Japanese Grand Prix. The 53-lap race was won by Rubens Barrichello driving for Ferrari after starting from pole position. Kimi Räikkönen, who started the race from eighth position, finished second in a McLaren car, with David Coulthard third in the other McLaren.

Barrichello's win saw Ferrari clinch their 13th Constructors Championship title, the team's fifth title in a row, with Barrichello's team-mate Michael Schumacher finishing eighth to secure his record-breaking 6th World Driver's Championship surpassing the record set by Juan Manuel Fangio in 1957. This was also Schumacher's fourth consecutive World Driver's title, matching the record set by Fangio in 1957.

This event also notably marked the last race for cars using launch control and fully-automatic gearboxes, since their reintroduction at the 2001 Spanish Grand Prix. The FIA banned these two electronic driver aid systems ahead of the  season. This was also the final Grand Prix for 3-time race winner Heinz-Harald Frentzen and Jos Verstappen, father of two-time world champion Max Verstappen.

Report

Background
Heading into the final race of the season, Ferrari driver Michael Schumacher was leading the World Driver's Championship standings with 92 points; McLaren driver Kimi Räikkönen was second on 83 points, 9 points behind Schumacher. A maximum of 10 points were available, which meant that Räikkönen could still win the title. Schumacher only needed an eighth-place finish to become Driver's Champion even if Räikkönen won the race. Räikkönen needed to win and Schumacher not to score a single point in order for him to become Driver's Champion.

There was one driver change heading into the race. Having been a driver for the BAR-Honda team for most of the season, Jacques Villeneuve pulled out of the Grand Prix after asking to be released by the team and was replaced by the team's test driver Takuma Sato. 

Sato had been confirmed as a driver for the team for the 2004 season in the days running up to the race and would drive alongside Jenson Button.

Friday drivers 
Three teams in the 2003 Constructors' Championship had the right to drive a third car on Friday that were involved in additional training. These drivers did not compete in qualifying or the race.

Classification

Qualifying

Race

Notes 
Takuma Sato finished 6th in his one and only race of the season.
Ralf Schumacher spun 3 times in this race, once with his brother Michael.
This was the last time to date that the Japanese Grand Prix was the final round of the season.
Last race for Heinz-Harald Frentzen, Jos Verstappen, Justin Wilson, Nicolas Kiesa and Ralph Firman.
This was David Coulthard's final podium until the 2006 Monaco Grand Prix.

Championship standings after the race 
Bold text indicates the World Champions.

Drivers' Championship standings

Constructors' Championship standings

Note: Only the top five positions are included for both sets of standings.

References

Japanese Grand Prix
Japanese Grand Prix
Grand Prix
Japanese Grand Prix